Karen Charnele Brown (née Dozier; born October 30, 1960) is an American actress, producer, writer, fashion designer and singer. Brown is perhaps best known for her role as Kimberly Reese on NBC comedy sitcom A Different World from 1988 until 1993.

Biography
Born in East Hampton, Brown is a graduate of East Hampton High School.

Brown later attended the State University of New York at New Paltz Where she studied acting with other notables, including Aida Turturro. Brown made her Broadway debut in 1989 as the first American member of the South African musical "Sarafina!" Other stage performances have included the roles of Polly and Delores in "The Trials and Tribulations of Stagger Lee Brown," Ruby in "The Lord's Will," Marty in "Sisters" and Mable in "My Diary." After A Different World ended, Brown guest starred on sitcoms such as Living Single, Martin, and Girlfriends. She made a brief appearance in a movie titled How Ya Like Me Now? that starred Darnell Williams and Salli Richardson.

References

External links
 
 Charnele Brown at Hollywood.com

1965 births
American television actresses
Living people
People from East Hampton (town), New York
American musical theatre actresses
21st-century American women
East Hampton High School alumni